Atul Bhatkhalkar (born 8 March 1965) is member of 13th Maharashtra Legislative Assembly who belongs to Bharatiya Janata Party. He is General Secretary of BJP Maharashtra State Unit.

The firebrand MLA Atul Bhatkhalkar received the coveted “India’s Affairs Maharashtra’s Most Promising Mass Leader & Best MLA 2017 at 8th Annual India Leadership Conclave & Indian Affairs Business Leadership Awards 2017 founded by Satya Brahma in Mumbai.

Atul Bhatkhalkar is a key decision-maker in his political career for several years. He played a potent role in formulating strategies in ongoing groundwork for his party throughout Maharashtra. He is known for his influential role as the spokesperson for Bhartiya Janta party from 1999 to 2001.
People know him as a leader that has had concerns for environmental and socio-philanthropic activities. He has worked in the economy’s liberalization policies globally, which resulted in significant changes in the field and is visible through the number of articles he has written to create awareness.
He has written a number of articles on liberalization of economy including on the World Trade Organization as well as on political and social topics in numerous newspapers, magazine and Marathi dailies.

Political and social career

He has been a R.S.S. Pracharak wherein he pledged his service as an individual to devote himself to its work in Thane & Sindhudurga District of Konkan Division for three years. He has been with Bhartiya Janta Party  from June 1991, and was office secretary of the Party from September 1991.
For four years, he participated as the secretary and publicity representative for the Bharatiya Janata Party in the Maharashtra Assembly Elections and Parliament elections. He was also significant in his role as the editor for Manogat, the Party’s in-house magazine that circulated around 30,000 copies since 1995, in addition to being a profound member of American Centre in India.

National pioneer

He has toured the state of West Bengal for a detailed study of political & social circumstances that led to the steady rule of Communism in the state. Through his experiences there, he wrote an instrumental book called West Bengal - Rule of Deep Rooted Communism." He has also studied the Dunkel proposal and its impact on the Indian economy, and wrote another book based on his theoretical studies.

Positions held

Within BJP
 Spokesperson BJP, Maharashtra - Since 1999 to 2001
 General Secretary, BJP, Maharashtra (2012)

Legislative
 Maharashtra Legislative Assembly, Since 2014

References

People from Mumbai Suburban district
Living people
1965 births
Maharashtra MLAs 2014–2019
Marathi politicians
Bharatiya Janata Party politicians from Maharashtra